Elyse Guttenberg (born August 9, 1952) is an Alaskan writer known primarily for her fantasy novels.

Biography
Elyse Guttenberg was born in New York City and grew up in Astoria, and Rochdale Village in Queens. In 1972, she followed her two brothers, Richard and David Guttenberg north to attend the University of Alaska Fairbanks where she received a bachelor's degree in Anthropology (1977) and a MAT in English (1979). At UAF Guttenberg was one of the founding editors of Permafrost, the nation's farthest north literary journal. Guttenberg served for many years as a member of the Alaska State Council on the Arts Literature Review Panel, and the Fairbanks North Star Borough Library Commission.

She married Luke Hopkins (born ca. 1945) in 1977 and has two grown children, Selena Hopkins-Kendall and Grier Hopkins. Luke Hopkins was the mayor of the Fairbanks North Star Borough until 2015, having been elected to the post in 2009 following his retirement from a career working at UAF. Grier Hopkins is an Alaska State Legislator.

Guttenberg is the recipient of an Individual Artist Fellowship in Literature from the Alaska State Council on the Arts, as well as an Artist's Initiative grant to publish "Inroads: An Anthology Celebrating Alaska's Twenty-Seven Fellowship Writers". Her novel "Sunder, Eclipse and Seed," received honorable mention for the William L. Crawford Award for the year's best new fantasy from the International Association for the Fantastic in the Arts.

Works
 Inroads: An Anthology Celebrating Alaska's Twenty-Seven Fellowship Writers, 1988, edited with Jean Anderson
 Sunder, Eclipse and Seed, Roc, 1990
 Summer Light, HarperCollins, 1995
 Daughter of the Shaman, HarperCollins, 1997

Shorter works
 "Selena's Song," in Spaceships and Spells, edited by Jane Yolen, Martin Greenberg, & Charles Waugh. Harper and Row, 1987
 "Plane Story," in The Women's Press Book of Myth and Magic, edited by Helen Windrath, The Women's Press, 1993
 "Rules for Winter," (poetry) About Place Journal, Vol.II, Issue II web page

Anthologies
 "The Faces of Fantasy: Photographs by Patti Perret," intro. by Terri Windling, 
 SUMMER LIGHT excerpt in "The Last New Land, stories of Alaska Past and Present," edited by Wayne Mergler, forward John Haines,

References

External links
 Permafrost
 Representative David Guttenberg
 Locus Index to Science Fiction Awards
 Alaska State Council on the Arts
 

1952 births
20th-century American novelists
American fantasy writers
American women short story writers
American women novelists
Writers from Fairbanks, Alaska
University of Alaska Fairbanks alumni
Living people
Women science fiction and fantasy writers
20th-century American women writers
20th-century American short story writers
21st-century American women